Brnobići may refer to the following places in Croatia:

 Brnobići, Buzet
 Brnobići, Kaštelir-Labinci